Hilbert's seventh problem is one of David Hilbert's list of open mathematical problems posed in 1900. It concerns the irrationality and transcendence of certain numbers (Irrationalität und Transzendenz bestimmter Zahlen).

Statement of the problem
Two specific equivalent questions are asked:
In an isosceles triangle, if the ratio of the base angle to the angle at the vertex is algebraic but not rational, is then the ratio between base and side always transcendental?
Is  always transcendental, for algebraic  and irrational algebraic ?

Solution
The question (in the second form) was answered in the affirmative by Aleksandr Gelfond in 1934, and refined by Theodor Schneider in 1935. This result is known as Gelfond's theorem or the Gelfond–Schneider theorem. (The restriction to irrational b is important, since it is easy to see that  is algebraic for algebraic a and rational b.)

From the point of view of generalizations, this is the case

of the general linear form in logarithms which was studied by Gelfond and then solved by Alan Baker. It is called the Gelfond conjecture or Baker's theorem. Baker was awarded a Fields Medal in 1970 for this achievement.

See also
Hilbert number or Gelfond–Schneider constant

References

Bibliography

External links 
 English translation of Hilbert's original address

07